Nguyễn Huy Hoàng (born 1 January 1981), is a Vietnamese former football player, playing for Sông Lam Nghệ An ever since he started his professional career. He was called up in the national team in 2002 and had participated in Vietnam's first encounter in the AFC Asian Cup in 2007. He is now the head coach of Sông Lam Nghệ An. He retired from international football in 2008 but come back in 2010 to participate in the 2010 AFF Suzuki Cup.

International goals

References

External links

1981 births
Living people
Vietnamese footballers
Vietnam international footballers
2007 AFC Asian Cup players
Song Lam Nghe An FC players
Footballers at the 2002 Asian Games
Footballers at the 2006 Asian Games
People from Nghệ An province
Association football fullbacks
Asian Games competitors for Vietnam